The El Monte Hotel, at 925 First Ave. in Monte Vista, Colorado was built in 1930 - 1931?  It was listed on the National Register of Historic Places in 1990. It is now known as Monte Villa Inn.

It was largely designed by E. Floyd Redding in Pueblo Revival style; it was built by Dutton-Kendall contractors.  It is notable for its design and for how it came about.

The town and its rural area long believed that a hotel was needed, and a committee was formed.  The hotel was funded by public subscription following development of a plan and estimation of construction costs of $112,000.  In a week-long drive, enough $100 shares were sold to raise $72,600, which, together with a bank mortgage, was just enough to enable the building to go forward.

References

External links

Hotels in Colorado
National Register of Historic Places in Rio Grande County, Colorado
Traditional Native American dwellings
Buildings and structures completed in 1930
Native American history of Colorado